Christophe Verdino (born 29 June 1973) is a Monegasque swimmer. He competed at the 1992 Summer Olympics and the 1996 Summer Olympics.

References

1973 births
Living people
Monegasque male swimmers
Olympic swimmers of Monaco
Swimmers at the 1992 Summer Olympics
Swimmers at the 1996 Summer Olympics
Place of birth missing (living people)